Zachary Williams (born 21 July 1995) is a New Zealand cyclist.

Williams was educated at St Peter's College, Auckland.

Williams won the 1000 m time trial at the 2016 Oceania Championships and was fourth in the keirin at the World Cup in Hong Kong. He was selected for the team sprint at the 2016 Summer Olympics in Rio de Janeiro, and filled New Zealand's second place in the men's road race but dropped out of the road race after 40 km.

References

Living people
1995 births
Olympic cyclists of New Zealand
Cyclists at the 2016 Summer Olympics
People educated at St Peter's College, Auckland
Cyclists from Auckland
New Zealand male cyclists
Cyclists at the 2018 Commonwealth Games
Commonwealth Games competitors for New Zealand
21st-century New Zealand people